Martin Šarić (born 18 August 1979 in Buenos Aires) is an Argentine retired footballer who played as a midfielder.

Career
Šarić began his career in his native Argentina in the youth system of San Lorenzo. He went on to play for the club's reserve side before being released in 1999. He went on to play for Sportivo Luqueño in Paraguay and Nueva Chicago, whom he helped return to the top flight in 2001, before moving to further his career in Europe in 2002.

He played in the UEFA Intertoto Cup with Croatian club NK Rijeka in 2002, played with FC Ljubljana in the Slovenian PrvaLiga in 2003, and played with Politehnica Iași in Romania in 2006/2007, as well as a short spell in Israel.

Šarić played 25 matches for NK Celje in the 2008/09 season before leaving the club shortly after the beginning of the 2009/10 season. He signed with Toronto FC on 26 March 2010 after a successful trial. He made his debut for Toronto FC on 27 March 2010 in a 2–0 loss to Columbus Crew. Saric scored his first goal for Toronto in a 2–1 home victory over Cruz Azul in the CONCACAF Champions League 17 August 2010. After making 23 appearances and scoring 1 goal in all competitions in the 2010 season with Toronto he was released by the club on 24 November.

His older brother was San Lorenzo's former player, Mirko Šarić, one of big hopes of Argentine football, who committed suicide in 2000.

Honours
Croatian national football league (Prva HNL) with NK Zagreb in 2002.

Toronto FC
Canadian Championship (1): 2010

References

External links

Martin Šarić at argentinesoccer.com

1979 births
Living people
Footballers from Buenos Aires
Argentine footballers
Argentine expatriate footballers
Croatian Football League players
FC Politehnica Iași (1945) players
HNK Rijeka players
Argentine expatriate sportspeople in Israel
Argentine expatriate sportspeople in the United States
Argentine expatriate sportspeople in Canada
Argentine expatriate sportspeople in Croatia
Argentine expatriate sportspeople in Paraguay
Argentine expatriate sportspeople in Romania
Argentine expatriate sportspeople in Slovenia
NK Zagreb players
Hapoel Be'er Sheva F.C. players
Toronto FC players
Liga I players
Major League Soccer players
Expatriate footballers in Paraguay
Expatriate footballers in Slovenia
NK Celje players
Expatriate footballers in Croatia
Nueva Chicago footballers
NK Ljubljana players
Expatriate footballers in Israel
ASC Oțelul Galați players
Expatriate footballers in Romania
Sportivo Luqueño players
Expatriate soccer players in Canada
Argentine people of Croatian descent
Association football midfielders